Louis Daly Irving Austin (20 February 1877 – 7 April 1967) was a New Zealand pianist, music teacher, conductor, composer and critical gadfly. He was born in London, England.

References

1877 births
1967 deaths
New Zealand conductors (music)
Male conductors (music)
English emigrants to New Zealand
New Zealand music teachers